Herbert Henry Brunning (25 August 1899 – 20 December 1969) was an Australian rules footballer who played with Richmond in the Victorian Football League (VFL).

Notes

External links 

1899 births
1969 deaths
Australian rules footballers from Melbourne
Richmond Football Club players
People from Lilydale, Victoria